The 1929 Florida Gators football team represented the University of Florida during the 1929 college football season. The season was Charlie Bachman's second as the head coach of the Florida Gators football team.  Bachman's 1929 Florida Gators finished with an overall record of 8–2, and a conference record of 6–1, placing fourth of twenty-three conference teams.

The highlights of the year included Southern Conference victories over the Virginia Military Institute Keydets, Auburn Tigers, Georgia Bulldogs, Clemson Tigers, South Carolina Gamecocks and Washington & Lee Generals, and a 20–6 intersectional upset over coach John McEwan's Oregon Webfoots in a neutral site game played at the old Madison Square Garden stadium in Miami, Florida.

Before the season
Former player Edgar Jones became athletic director and Joe Bedenk left. James Van Fleet returned to help assist Bachman.

Coach Bachman began the season's intensive practices on the beach at Anastasia Island, some ten miles from Saint Augustine. A fierce battle amongst the eleven running backs featured. A good backfield was expected.

Bachman later said the 1929 team "was as good as the 1928 team and would have been better had we not lost Carl Brumbaugh from the year before. He was our passer, and he was our thinker. He could get the ball to Van Sickel. In those days the halfbacks passed more than the quarterback. And boy did we pass. In the flats a lot, like they do now."

Schedule

Season summary

Week 1: Florida Southern
The Gators opened the season with a 54–0 romp of Florida Southern. The Gators made 19 first downs and 8 touchdowns; Florida Southern made no first downs.

Week 2: VMI

Prior to the game, Royce Goodbread and Ed Sauls stood out in preparations. Florida won a close game in Tampa over the V. M. I. Keydets 12 to 7. VMI frequently used the forward pass; and the Gators used a new huddle system.

The first score came from Royce Goodbread after many exchanges of punts. Rainey Cawthon made a 25-yard pass into another touchdown.  The Keydets touchdown was scored on a 2-yard run by Dunn.

Week 3: at Auburn

In Florida's first night game, the Gators defeated the Auburn Tigers 19 to 0.

Florida's first touchdown came on a 30-yard run from Clyde Crabtree through tackle. A 10-yard pass from Red Bethea to Dale Van Sickel brought the second touchdown. The last score was a 15-yard pass from Red McEwen to Jimmy Nolan. After the game, acting under orders of Governor Graves, law enforcement officers seized and destroyed some 75 pints of liquor which had been brought to the contest.

The starting lineup for the Gators against Harvard: Green (left end), Waters (left tackle), McRae (left guard), Haines (center), Houser (right guard), Dedge (right tackle), Hall (right end), Crabtree (quarterback), Bethea (left halfback), Goodbread (right halfback), Cawthon (fullback).

Week 4: at Georgia Tech

Florida lost to coach Bill Alexander's Georgia Tech Yellow Jackets on Grant Field 19–6. Fumbles cost Florida dearly. Georgia Tech's ability to stop the Gator backfield was surprising.

A 30-yard pass, Earl Dunlap to Warner Mizell, and 7 yards after the catch from Mizell, got the first touchdown for the Yellow Jackets. A 25-yard pass from Dunlap to Vance Maree got the second. The final score for Tech came on a pass from Mizell to Stumpy Thomason.  A pitch to Rainey Cawthon got the lone Gator score.

Week 5: Georgia

The Gators upset the Georgia Bulldogs for the second year in a row, by a score of 18 to 6, just two days after the Stock Market Crash. Georgia had already defeated Yale.

A long pass from Red Bethea to Green started things going in the second quarter, down to Georgia's 14-yard line. After driving down to the 3, Bethea scored on a wide end run. Dale Van Sickel recovered a blocked punt in the third quarter inside the 30-yard line.  Rainey Cawthon and company drove the ball inside the 10-yard line. A pass from Clyde Crabtree to Van Sickel got a touchdown. Crabtree later returned an interception for a touchdown. In the final minutes, Ed Sauls ran 60 yards through the Georgia defense, the highlight of the contest.

Georgia quarterback Austin Downes broke his arm during the game. Florida running back Royce Goodbread also suffered an injury.

Week 6: at Harvard

Coach Arnold Horween's Harvard Crimson defeated the Florida Gators 14 to 0 in front of a crowd of 35,000. Michigan coach Fielding Yost watched the game from the stands.

The starting lineup for the Gators against Harvard: Nolan (left end), Proctor (left tackle), Reeves (left guard), Clemons (center), Steele (right guard), Waters (right tackle), Van Sickel (right end), Crabtree (quarterback), Bethea (left halfback), Dorsett (right halfback), Cawthon (fullback).

Week 7: Clemson

The Gators beat Josh Cody's Clemson Tigers 13–7 at homecoming. The first Florida score came on a 9-yard pass from Red Bethea to Dale Van Sickel. The second came on a short run by Rainey Cawthon after a 28-yard run by Bethea.

Week 8: at South Carolina

The Gators defeated coach Billy Laval's South Carolina Gamecocks 20 to 7. Florida substitutes started the game, coming in some 5 minutes in after a blocked punt on the 18-yard line. Six runs at the line later, Rainey Cawthon scored. A pass from Clyde Crabtree to Dale Van Sickel got the extra point. Early in the second quarter, South Carolina blocked another punt. This time they capitalized with a 15-yard touchdown pass, Rhame to Stoddard. Boineau added the extra point from placement.

The same Boineau later fumbled a punt, recovered by Florida. A pass from Crabtree to Red Bethea gained 12 and a run around right end from Bethea got a touchdown. Crabtree passed to Van Sickel for the conversion.  A Van Sickel interception ended South Carolina's fiercest threat, which eventually turned into another Cawthon touchdown. The final touchdown drive caused injuries to both Van Sickel and Bethea. The try was missed.

The starting lineup for the Gators against South Carolina: L. Greene (left end), Phiel (left tackle), McRae (left guard), Clark (center), James (right guard), Dedge (right tackle), Vickery (right end), McEwen (quarterback), Dorsett (left halfback), Goodbread (right halfback), Silsby (fullback).

Week 9: Washington & Lee

The Gators defeated coach Gene Oberst's Washington & Lee Generals 25–7 in their annual Thanksgiving matchup. Sophomore halfback Monk Dorsett was the star of the game, scoring two touchdowns.

Week 10: Oregon

At the old Madison Square Garden Stadium in Miami on December 7, in front of more than 25,000, the Gators had a major inter-sectional victory over coach John McEwan's Oregon Webfoots 20 to 6. The Gators had a light drill on Fleming Field on the afternoon of the 5th. At 9:30 they embarked on a special train, which transferred to the train bearing the Oregon players at Palatka.

The heat forced many Oregon players to take off their jerseys.  Clyde Crabtree, in his final game, had a touchdown on a punt return of 80 yards, Ed Sauls had one on a run through the line of 38 yards. The other score came on 10-yard run by Red McEwen.

The starting lineup for the Gators against Oregon: Parnell (left end), Waters (left tackle), Steele (left guard), Clemons (center), Reeves (right guard), Proctor (right tackle), Nolan (right end), Crabtree (quarterback), Dorsett (left halfback), Goodbread (right halfback), Cawthon (fullback).

Postseason
Red Bethea was elected captain of next year's team.

Personnel

Depth chart
The following chart provides a visual depiction of Florida's lineup during the 1929 season with games started at the position reflected in parenthesis. The chart mimics a Notre Dame Box on offense.

Line

Starters

Subs

Backfield

Starters

Subs

Coaching staff
Head coach: Charlie Bachman
Assistants: James Van Fleet, Nash Higgins (line), Joe Holsinger (backfield), Brady Cowell (freshmen), George Weber, A. P. Pierson.

See also
 1929 College Football All-Southern Team

References

Additional sources
 

Florida
Florida Gators football seasons
Florida Gators football